Shore City Shopping Centre is an enclosed shopping centre in the North Shore suburb of Takapuna, Auckland, New Zealand established in 1974. It was previously owned by Westfield Group and is now owned and managed by Precision Group. The mall is situated near Takapuna Beach.

Shopping centre
Refurbished in 2010, it was sold by Westfield Group in 2012 to Aviva Investors Asia Pacific Property Fund, a part of Aviva, a global insurance company. In 2016 the shopping centre was sold to Precision Group as Aviva was folding up its global property fund and Shore City was one of its last assets. The shopping centre has a total of 73 tenancies.

The shopping mall has a multistorey car park comprising circa 831 bays. The main occupants of the shopping centre are a Farmers department store on Level One and Two, New World supermarket on the ground floor, and Les Mills Fitness Centre. The mall is managed by Precision Group.

References

Shopping centres in New Zealand
Shopping centres in the Auckland Region
Buildings and structures in Auckland
1974 establishments in New Zealand
North Shore, New Zealand
1970s architecture in New Zealand